Cyanide is a class of chemical compounds.

Cyanide may also refer to:

Cyanide as poison
 Cyanide poisoning, a form of poisoning that occurs when a living organism is exposed to a compound that produces cyanide ions when dissolved in water 
 Cyanide fishing, an illegal form of fishing common in South East Asia, which usually uses the chemical compound sodium cyanide

Film
 Cyanide (2006 film), a 2006 Indian Kannada language film
 Cyanide (1930 film), a 1930 German drama film

Music
 "Cyanide" (song), a 2008 song by Metallica
 "Cyanide", a song by Bad Religion from their album The Dissent of Man (2010)
 "Cyanide", a song by Deathstars from their album Termination Bliss (2006)
"Cyanide", a song by Daniel Caesar from his album Case Study 01 (2019)

Other uses
 Cyanide (company), a game development studio
 Cyanide millipede, a millipede found in the moist forests along the Pacific coast of North America
 Cyanide process, a metallurgical technique for extracting gold from low-grade ore

See also
 :Category:Cyanides